The 2000 Dartmouth Big Green football team was an American football team that represented Dartmouth College during the 2000 NCAA Division I-AA football season. The Big Green tied for second-to-last in the Ivy League.

In its ninth season under head coach John Lyons, the team compiled a 2–8 record and was outscored 388 to 231. Peter Chapman and Richard Joyce were the team captains.

The Big Green's 1–6 conference record tied for worst in the Ivy League standings, though both they and Columbia are considered to have tied for sixth, as 4–3 Brown was excluded from the championship and recorded as finishing last. Dartmouth was outscored 290 to 155 by Ivy opponents. 

Dartmouth played its home games at Memorial Field on the college campus in Hanover, New Hampshire.

Schedule

Roster

References

Dartmouth
Dartmouth Big Green football seasons
Dartmouth Football